The Singapore Armed Forces Band (commonly known as the SAF Band) form the musical arm of the Singapore Armed Forces. Consisting of the SAF Central Band and the SAF Ceremonial Band, the SAF Band provides musical support for key events such as the National Day Parade, SAF Day Parade, Passing Out Parades, Change of Command Parades and other military duties. Other than discharging ceremonial duties, the SAF Band also presents public concerts that aim to bring a wide range of music to the populace. They also seek to build up the band's music repertoire into an extensive array of styles and variety.

History 

Singapore's military music would begin a year before it became self-governing. The formation of the Singapore Military Forces Staff Band on 1 June 1958 spelled the beginning of the nation's love affair with military bands. From this core group of 45 musicians would come five generations of military musicians from the country’s armed services.

WO1 Frederick Roy, the 15th/19th Hussars bandmaster became the first Director of Music of the SMFSB, a duty he did until 1962. The band's main duty then was as musical support to the Singapore Infantry Regiment's activities. One of his young musicians, SSGT Abdullah Ahmad, was sent to the Royal Military School of Music for further training, later becoming a warrant officer upon graduating. The band's first composition, the Singapore Infantry Regiment March, later became the Singapore Army's official march.

Lt. Edward Crowcroft of the York and Northumberland Brigade Band succeeded WO1 Roy in September 1962 as Bandmaster and Director of Music. By November, it became the Singapore Infantry Regiment Band, and WO1 Arthur Edward Hollowell, DOM of the Band of the Parachute Brigade, replaced Lt. Crowcroft. He became a captain by the commission and led the band to its first overseas visit in 1964: the band's visit to Kuala Lumpur as part of the Independence Day Parade on 31 August that year.

A year after, WO1 Ahmad was appointed the Singapore Armed Forces Director of Music, becoming a lieutenant, and later as captain. He led the new SIR Band to the very first National Day Parade on the Padang the following year. By 1968, the band made its first recording under his direction. By that time now LTA Ahmad was also responsible for the Band of the People' Defence Force, the official band of the armed forces' volunteer component. After different names, the band was dissolved in 1974 and personnel were given to the other bands.

At the same time, the Band of the Singapore Armed Forces was formed, with joint headquarters with the SIR Band at HQ 1 Singapore Infantry Btn., Beach Road Camp. They both later moved to HQ 3 SIB at Ulu Pandan Camp and later at 5 SIB at Portsdown Camp, and by 1972, the latter band was led by a Republic of Singapore Police officer, WO1 Ervin Dragon.

By January the next year, a new band, the NSF (National Service-Full-time) Band, was formed at Telok Pagu Camp at Changi. WO2 Alan Teo became its first conductor.

May saw the first name change for the bands. They were renamed as

 3 Singapore Infantry Btn. Band, also known as the SIR Band
 4 Singapore Infantry Brigade. Band, also known as the Band of the Singapore Armoured Regiment
 2 Singapore Infantry Btn. Band

Alan Teo, by then a captain, left the DOM post at 2 SIB band by July that year, to join the then newly created SAF Music and Drama Company. Tonni Wei, then a sergeant and playing with one of the bands, was then studying at the Royal Military School of Music, graduating in October 1976 to become the bandmaster of 2 SIB Band, was commissioned as a second lieutenant (2LT)

In 1975, the 3 SIB Band soon moved to Jurong Camp, the 3rd Division headquarters.

In January 1977, Tonni Wei joined the MDC and Alan Teo returned to his old post. By February, 3 SIB Band became the SIR Band yet again, and Teo joined the now renamed Band of the Republic of Singapore Navy-the former 2 SIB Band-to Sembawang Camp and the RSN School of Naval Training. The SIR Band would later relocate itself at Jurong Camp that May. Peter Yan, then a musician sergeant with the army, and a part of the SIR Band, was then studying at Uxbridge at the RAF School of Music for Director of Music training. He graduated the next year and soon joined the RSN Band as its director.

CPT Ahmad retired from his post in May 1979.

In 1981, SGT Terry Seah Cheong Lock, who started his military music career earlier in 1975 with the Singapore Armoured Regiment Band, returned to Singapore from the UK after graduating from the Royal Air Force School of Music in England. He was commissioned as an officer upon his return, as well as being appointed the new Director of Music of SIR Band. CPT Terry Seah Cheong Lock led the band for 13 years, up to 1994.

As the 1980s progressed the public image of the bands was positive indeed, reinforced with increased participation of the service bands in the NDP and major military events such as the Open Houses as well as their concerts. By 1982, the SAR Band (4SIB Band) was soon relaunched as the Republic of Singapore Air Force Band, and would later move to Tengah Air Base. The SIR Band was also relaunched as the Singapore Army Band, but the band's new name and image never caught on. In 1986 the RSN Band welcomed its first lady musician. Their first appearance together in the NDP was in 1987's edition in the Padang conducted by the SAF's first Senior Director of Music MAJ Erwin Dragon, with another joint performance in 1990. 1988 saw the rebirth of the SAF Music Board and the formation of the SAF Symphonic Wind Band.

The SAF Band was formed in 1994 from men and women of the Singapore Infantry Regiment Band, Republic of Singapore Air Force Band and Republic of Singapore Navy Band. The formation of SAF Band come in a restructuring of the bands within the Ministry of Defence for more effective distribution of manpower. From 1994, the different bands within the SAF Band operated at different camps and locations. The SAF Central Band and SAF Band HQ(RSNB) were by the time of the merger in Tanglin Camp, Parade Band B (RSAFB) in Tengah Airbase and Parade Band A (SIRB) in Pasir Laba Camp, as they formerly represented the three branches of the SAF before their 1994 merger which resulted to these bands playing for the SAF at various events, including their participation in the National Day Parade as regular participants and arrival honours ceremonies at the Istana. These sections combined in November 2003 after the completion of renovations work to the 'White House', the former British Officers’ Mess in Nee Soon Camp.

In 2009, the Parade Bands were renamed as the SAF Ceremonial Band to reflect their duties more accurately.

Logo 
The logo of SAF Band is a combination of the three services within the armed forces. Light blue signifies the air division, red signifies the land division and deep blue signifies the sea division. They are all united within the lyre, which is a universal symbol of military musicians. The logo is topped with the National Coat of Arms which was launched on 3 December 1959 together with the National Flag and National Anthem at the installation of the Yang di-Pertuan Negara at the City Hall steps and adopted by government agencies nationwide. Below the logo is a banner inscribed with the Band's motto, "In Harmony". The logo was designed by MAJ Tonni Wei and SSG Goh Poh Wah.

Structure of SAF Band 
The unit is made up the SAF Band HQ and two operational bands: the SAF Central Band and the SAF Ceremonial Band.

SAF Band HQ 
The SAF Band HQ is led by Senior Director of Music, ME6 Philip Tng and Regimental Sergeant Major (SBM), ME3 Gilbert Lim.

SAF Central Band 

The SAF Central Band was formed during the merger of the tri-service bands in 1994 to serve as the premier band of the Singapore Armed Forces. Staffed by professional military musicians, the SAF Central Band provides top-notch musical support to all major State and SAF functions, parades and ceremonies. As the premier band of the SAF, the SAF Central Band is often seen at the Istana, performing for Presidential events and Welcome Ceremonies for visiting foreign dignitaries. 

The SAF Central Band delivers performances in various capacities. Other than being a wind orchestra, the band also plays the role of a marching display band and a ceremonial band. The band often reconfigures itself into other smaller groups, including chamber and jazz ensembles. 

An integral part of the National Day Parade, the SAF Central Band also regularly performs at the Esplanade Concert Hall through its annual 'In Harmony' and ‘Chamber Repertory’ concert series. Thus far, the SAF Central Band has collaborated with many distinguished conductors, composers and soloists, including Allan McMurray, Douglas Bostock, Frank Ticheli, Evelyn Glennie, Jan Van der Roost, Toshio Akiyama, Yasuhide Ito, Eric Whitacre, Hardy Mertens , Philip Sparke, James Barnes, Steven Mead and Tsung Yeh. 

As musical ambassadors of Singapore and the SAF, the SAF Central Band have been invited to perform in numerous countries, including Brunei, Canada, France, Germany, India, Japan, Malaysia, the People’s Republic of China, the Russian Federation, Scotland, South Korea, Sweden, Switzerland, and the United States of America, with its varied performances well received by audiences and organisers worldwide.

On the domestic front, the SAF Central Band's ambassadorial efforts include school outreach programmes, where schools have the opportunity to visit the band for a day of joint music-making. 

Through musical excellence, the SAF Central Band projects the professionalism of the Singapore Armed Forces and rouses the spirit of the nation in peacetime and war. Through its international audience and captivating performances, the SAF Central Band also strives to strengthens defence relations with foreign armed forces.

Since it was created on the basis of the Band of the Republic of Singapore Navy (created 1969 as the Armed Forces Band), the Central Band continues its lineage.

 Director of Music: ME4 Ignatius Wang
 Band Major: ME3 Chiu Boon Hwee
 Drum Major: ME2 Jash Chua
 Concertmaster &  Group Leader: ME2 Ang Yi Xiang
 Group Leader: ME2 Ronnie Quek Boon Kiang
 Group Leader: ME2 Hazizi Jaafar
 Group Leader: ME2 Dax Wilson Liang

SAF Ceremonial Band 
Made up of Full-time National Servicemen (NSF) and Operationally-Ready National Servicemen (NSmen), the SAF Ceremonial Band supports the monthly Istana Changing of the Guards Ceremony, Specialist Cadet School (SCS) Graduation Parade, Officer Cadet School (OCS) Commissioning Parades, Guard of Honour (GOH) Parades for visiting dignitaries and other internal SAF ceremonies. The Ceremonial Band's two sections continue the heritage of the bands of the Singapore Infantry Regiment and the Republic of Singapore Air Force.

 Director of Music: ME5 Tan Aik Kee Ken Steven
 Acting Director of Music: ME3 Goh Poh Wah
 Band Major: ME3 Maswan Nawar
 Drum Major: ME2 Winston Goh
 Drum Major: ME2 Hafis Amron

Key Personnel 
 Senior Director of Music: ME6 Philip Tng Liat Peng
 Director of Music, SAF Ceremonial Band / Head Operations Support Branch: ME5 Tan Aik Kee Ken Steven 
 Director of Music, SAF Central Band: ME4 Ignatius Wang
 Unit Logistics Officer: ME4 Ong Wee Hong
 Acting Director of Music, SAF Ceremonial Band,: ME3 Goh Poh Wah
 Regimental Sergeant Major: ME3 Lim Wee Beng Gilbert

Ceremonies and parades 
 Change of Guards (COG) Ceremony: Together with the new guards from SAF Military Police (MP) command, the band marches down Orchard Road to Istana for the ceremony which involves a public performance by the Silent Precision Drill Squad (SPDS).
 Presentation of Credentials (POC) Parade: Held in Istana to welcome Foreign Dignitaries
 Guard of Honour (GOH) Parade: Held in Ministry of Defence (MINDEF) to welcome Foreign Dignitaries
 Change of Command (COC) Parade: Held to commemorate the official transfer of authority and responsibility for a unit from a commanding officer to another.
 Basic Military Training Centre (BMTC) Passing Out Parade: Held in Floating Platform @ Marina Bay, Pasir Laba Camp and the Singapore Sports Hub
 Specialist Cadet Graduation Parade (SCGP): Held in Pasir Laba Camp Leaders Square
 Officer Cadet School (OCS) Commissioning Parade: Held in SAFTI Military Institute (MI)
 Singapore Armed Forces (SAF) Day: Held in SAFTI MI, the main objective of this day is for the members of the armed forces to reaffirm their pledge of loyalty and dedication to the SAF and the nation.
 National Day Parade (NDP): The band is actively involved in the annual event in commemoration of Singapore's independence since 1965.
 Other Special Deployments: Military Tattoos, Anniversary Parades, Trooping of Colours, Openings of Military Exercises, Military Funerals

Performances
The SAF Band had also represented Singapore at international music festivals. These include:
 2000 – the Toowoomba Carnival of Flowers street parade in Australia;
 2001 – the Festival International de Musiques Militaires in Saumur, France;
 2002 – the Kuala Lumpur International Tattoo in Malaysia;
 2006 – the Brunei International Tattoo in Bandar Seri Begawan, Brunei Darussalam; the Wonju Tattoo in South Korea;
 2007 – the India Tattoo in New Delhi; the Kuala Lumpur International Tattoo in Malaysia;
 2008 – the Quebec International Tattoo in Canada;
 2009 – the Nanchang Tattoo in China;
 2010 – the Japan Self-Defense Force Tattoo in Tokyo, Japan;
 2011 – the Bremen International Tattoo in Germany; the Brunei International Tattoo in Bandar Seri Begawan, Brunei Darussalam;
 2012 – the Spasskaya International Tattoo in Moscow, Russia;
 2013 – the Malmö Tattoo in Sweden;
 2014 – the Basel Tattoo in Switzerland; the Royal Edinburgh Military Tattoo in Scotland; the Kuala Lumpur International Tattoo in Malaysia;
 2016 – the Amur Waves International Military Tattoo in Khabarovsk, Russia;
 2017 – the Virginia International Tattoo in Virginia, United States of America;
 2018 – the Japan Self-Defense Forces Marching Festival in Tokyo, Japan
 2019 – the Nanchang International Military Tattoo in Nanchang, China

SAF Ceremonial Music

Salutes

Slow Marches

Quick Marches

Ceremonial Music

SAF Songs

External links 

 Singapore Armed Forces Band
 SAF Band Facebook Page
 Ministry of Defence, Singapore

Military of Singapore
Singaporean concert bands
Singaporean marching bands
Wind bands
Mandai
Military bands